The Corrigan (O'Corrigan, Carrigan, Corocan, Courigan, Currigan) surname is of Irish origin. Corrigan means a "Spear" in Irish. It is believed to have originated from Coirdhecan in Eoghain. It is also believed to be connected to the Maguire clan. The Corrigan surname was common in the 17th century in County Fermanagh. Today it has spread across most of Ireland, Scotland and to the United States and Canada.

The Irish sept Ó Corragáin, whose stronghold was in County Fermanagh, is the origin of the names Corrigan, Carrigan, Courigan, Corgan, and Currigan. Early records in the Annals of the Four Masters indicate the name was associated with clerics and abbots. It was well established during the Middle Ages, spreading south into the counties of Monaghan, Meath, Roscommon and Offaly. The village of Ballycorrigan near Nenagh in County Tipperary indicates the name also spread to that county.

A Corrigan Coat of Arms consists of a chevron between two trefoils slipt, in chief and in base a wingless dragon passant vert. The motto is: Consilio et Impetu.

Persons with the surname Corrigan
 Brad Corrigan (born 1974), musician
 Brent Corrigan (born 1986), also known by his real name Sean Paul Lockhart, American model, film actor and gay pornographic actor
 Briana Corrigan (born 1965), Northern Irish singer
 Carol Corrigan (born 1948), associate justice of the California Supreme Court
 Christa McAuliffe nee Corrigan (1948–1986), astronaut
 Ray "Crash" Corrigan (1902–1976), American actor
 D'Arcy Corrigan (1870–1945), Irish lawyer who became a character actor in many films
 Dennis Corrigan (born 1944), American illustrator
 Derek Corrigan, Mayor of the City of Burnaby, BC, Canada
 Sir Dominic Corrigan (1802–1880), Irish physician
 Dominic Corrigan (Gaelic footballer), born 1962
 Douglas Corrigan (1907–1995) (known as "Wrong Way" Corrigan), American aviator
 Ed Corrigan (born 1946), British mathematician and theoretical physicist
 Edward C. Corrigan (1843–1924), American horse racing executive
 Felicitas Corrigan (1908–2003), nun, author, and humanitarian
 Gene Corrigan (1928–2020), American lacrosse player, coach, and college athletics administrator
 E. Gerald Corrigan (born 1941), American banker
 Gordon Corrigan (born 1942), British military historian
 Jack Corrigan (lawyer) (born 1956), American lawyer
 Jack Corrigan (sportscaster) (born 1952), American sportscaster 
 Joe Corrigan (born 1948), British soccer player 
 John Corrigan (born 1952), American religion scholar
 Joseph M. Corrigan (1879–1942), American Catholic bishop and academic
 Kevin Corrigan (born 1969), American actor
 Kelly Corrigan (born 1967), American author
 Lloyd Corrigan (1900–1969), American film actor, producer, screenwriter and director
 Mairead Corrigan Maguire (born 1944), Northern Irish activist and co-founder of the Community of Peace People
 Martyn Corrigan, (born 1977), Scottish football player
 Maura D. Corrigan (born 1948), Michigan-based American public administrator
 Archbishop Michael Corrigan (1839–1902) of the diocese of New York
 Michelle Corrigan, fictional character from Doctors
 Peter Corrigan (1941–2016), Australian architect
 Reggie Corrigan (born 1970), Irish rugby union footballer
 Robert A. Corrigan (born 1935), former president of San Francisco State University
 Tomás Corrigan (born 1990), Gaelic footballer
 Tommy Corrigan (1903–1943), Australian rules footballer and soldier
 Wilfred Corrigan, British engineer and entrepreneur, founder of LSI Logic Corp.

Persons with the surname Currigan

 Martin D. Currigan (Ireland 1845–1900), local Irish-American politician in state of Colorado
 Thomas G. Currigan (1920–2014), local American politician in the state of Colorado; grandson of Martin D. Currigan
Michael Corrigan, author

Persons with the surname Carrigan
Denis Carrigan (Kilkenny, Ireland) local Irish farmer
Lynnsey Carrigan, American author

Persons with the surname Corgan
 Billy Corgan (born 1967), lead musician for the alternative rock band The Smashing Pumpkins

Fictional characters
 Atlas Corrigan, character in author Colleen Hoover's novel It Ends with Us
 Korrigan (Breton folklore), female fairy in Breton folklore
 Jim Corrigan, the name of three fictional characters that have appeared in comic books published by DC Comics
 Jimmy Corrigan, from the graphic novel "Jimmy Corrigan, the Smartest Kid on Earth"
 Mark Corrigan, character in the British television series Peep Show
 Kate Corrigan, from Hellboy
 Emma Corrigan, the principal character from British author Sophie Kinsella's novel Can You Keep A Secret?
 John Corrigan, main character from Colum McCann's novel Let the Great World Spin
 Michael Corrigan, the plot driving character from the hit Netflix original series House of Cards
 Corrigan, the main antagonist of Driver: Parallel Lines

See also
 Corrigan (disambiguation)
 Currigan
 Korrigan
 Clan Corrigan, website with reference material, biographies, clan and genealogical sources

References

Surnames of Irish origin